Miguel Marí Sánchez (born 30 June 1997) is a Spanish footballer who plays for Orihuela CF on loan from SD Eibar as a midfielder.

Club career
Born in Alicante, Valencian Community, Marí represented Hércules CF and Valencia CF before joining Inter Milan's Primavera squad in 2015, playing as a forward. In January of the following year, however, he returned to Spain and joined Real Valladolid's youth setup.

Marí was promoted to Valladolid's B-team in June 2016, and made his senior debut on 28 August by playing the last 14 minutes of a 1–2 Segunda División B home loss against CD Boiro. He scored his first senior goal on 27 November, netting his team's third in a 3–1 away win against CD Tudelano.

On 2 July 2018, free agent Marí signed for SD Eibar, being initially assigned to farm team CD Vitoria, also in the third division. He made his first team – and La Liga – –debut the following 23 April, coming on as a first-half substitute for injured Pape Diop in a 0–2 loss at SD Huesca.

On 6 September 2020, Marí moved to Orihuela CF in the third division on loan for the 2020–21 season.

Personal life
Marí's father, José Miguel, was also a footballer. A goalkeeper, he notably represented Hércules in the 90s.

References

External links

1997 births
Living people
Footballers from Alicante
Spanish footballers
Association football midfielders
La Liga players
Segunda División B players
Tercera División players
Real Valladolid Promesas players
CD Vitoria footballers
SD Eibar footballers
Orihuela CF players
Spanish expatriate footballers
Spanish expatriate sportspeople in Italy
Expatriate footballers in Italy